Soltindan is the highest mountain on the island of Ringvassøya which is located in Karlsøy Municipality in Troms og Finnmark county, Norway. Just to the north of the peak is the small glacial lake, Brevatnet.

References

Karlsøy
Mountains of Troms og Finnmark